Israel Jerez Martínez (born 8 August 1986), sometimes known simply as Israel, is a Spanish former footballer who played as a winger.

Club career
Born in Granada, Andalusia, Jerez finished his formation with local Arenas CD, and made his senior debut with the club in the 2004–05 season in Segunda División B, suffering team relegation. He returned to the third level only for 2007–08, signing with Granada CF.

In the following four years, Jerez continued competing in the third tier of Spanish football, representing CD Toledo, CD Roquetas, CP Cacereño and Real Jaén. He achieved promotion to Segunda División with the latter team in 2013, scoring seven goals in 37 games in the process.

Jerez played his first professional match on 18 August 2013, starting in a 1–2 home loss against SD Eibar. He made 35 appearances during the campaign, with Jaén eventually being relegated back to the third level; his first and only goal in the second tier occurred on 15 December 2013, when he helped the hosts defeat RCD Mallorca 2–1.

On 22 July 2014, Jerez moved to CD Alcoyano also from the third division.

References

External links
 
 
 
 

1986 births
Living people
Footballers from Granada
Spanish footballers
Association football wingers
Segunda División players
Segunda División B players
Tercera División players
Granada CF footballers
CD Toledo players
CP Cacereño players
Real Jaén footballers
CD Alcoyano footballers
Barakaldo CF footballers
La Roda CF players